Melvin Isaac Simon (born February 8, 1937 in New York City) is an American molecular biologist, molecular geneticist, and microbiologist.

Biography
After secondary education at Manhattan's Yeshiva University High School for Boys, he graduated in 1959 with a B.S. from City College of New York and in 1963 with a Ph.D. from Brandeis University. From 1963 to 1965 he was a postdoc at Princeton University. From 1965 to 1982 he was a faculty member of the biology department of the University of California, San Diego (UCSD). In 1982 he and UCSD professor John Abelson founded the Agouron Institute. In 1982 Simon and Abelson both moved to California Institute of Technology (Caltech). In the Division of Biology of Caltech, Simon was Biaggini Professor of Biological Sciences from 1982 to 2007, when he retired from Caltech as professor emeritus. At Caltech he was the chair of his department from 1995 to 2000. At the UC San Diego School of Medicine, was an adjunct professor of pharmacology from 2007 when he retired from UCSD.

Simon is the author or coauthor of over 350 scientific publications. Simon's group at UCSD did important research on bacterial movement and chemotaxis. Michael Robert Silverman (born in 1943) and Melvin Simon are credited with the discovery that bacterial flagella are based in rotary motors. Silverman was Simon's doctoral student.

Simon’s laboratory group at Caltech played an important role in the Human Genome Project (HGP) and built many of the initial libraries that provided the basic material for the HGP. Simon's group invented in 1992 bacterial artificial chromosomes (BACs) and in 1994 phage artificial chromosomes (PACs) using the P1 phage. The group's scientists were among the main developers of the maps of human chromosome 16 and human chromosome 22. In 2002 Simon and colleagues determined the complete genome sequence of Pyrobaculum aerophilum, a hyperthermophilic archaeum. Simon and his Caltech group gained an international reputation for their research on G-proteins and the molecular mechanisms of how these proteins are essential for transmitting signals detected on cellular surfaces into cellular interiors. Simon and colleagues demonstrated how various genetic mutations in bacteria, nematodes, and mice cause various abnormalities and diseases.

Simon has been involved with a number of non-profit organizations and commercial corporations. He was one of the founders of Agouron Pharmaceuticals, Inc., which was acquired by Warner-Lambert in 1999. He was also one of the founders of the Diversa Corporation, which was merged with the Celunol Corporation in 2007 to form the Verenium Corporation.

Simon was a Guggenheim fellow for the academic year 1978–1979. He was elected a member of the National Academy of Sciences in 1985 and a fellow of the American Academy of Arts and Sciences in 1986. In 1991 he received the Selman A. Waksman Award in Microbiology.

In January 1937 in the Bronx, he married Linda Fried. They have two sons and a daughter.

Selected publications

Articles
 
 
 
  (over 2700 citations)
 
  1996 (over 500 citations)
 
 
 
  2000 (over 1100 citations)

Books

References

1937 births
Living people
American molecular biologists
American microbiologists
Molecular geneticists
Phage workers
City College of New York alumni
Brandeis University alumni
University of California, San Diego faculty
California Institute of Technology faculty
Fellows of the American Academy of Arts and Sciences
Members of the United States National Academy of Sciences